Lacey Nicole Chabert (born September 30, 1982) is an American actress. One of her first roles was playing the daughter of Erica Kane on All My Children, from 1992 until 1993. She then gained further prominence as a child actress for her role as Claudia Salinger in the Fox television drama Party of Five (1994–2000).

Chabert provided the voice of Eliza Thornberry in the Nickelodeon animated series The Wild Thornberrys (1998–2004) along with two feature films, The Wild Thornberrys Movie and Rugrats Go Wild. She was also the voice of Meg Griffin during the first season of the animated sitcom Family Guy, and superhero Zatanna Zatara in several parts of DC Comics-related media.

In film, she has appeared in Lost in Space (1998), Not Another Teen Movie (2001), and Daddy Day Care (2003), and had leading roles as Gretchen Wieners in Mean Girls (2004), Meg Cummings in Dirty Deeds (2005), Dana Mathis in the horror remake Black Christmas (2006) and Penelope in the Christmas animated film All I Want for Christmas Is You (2017). Chabert has also appeared in over 30 Hallmark Channel films.

Early life 
Chabert was born in Purvis, Mississippi, on September 30, 1982. Her father is Cajun from Louisiana. She was "World's Baby Petite" in the "World's Our Little Miss Scholarship Competition" in 1985. In 1992 and 1993, she played young Cosette in the Broadway production of Les Misérables.

Acting career 
Chabert played the role of Cosette in Les Misérables on Broadway before taking the role of Claudia Salinger in Party of Five. Chabert made her big-screen debut in the late 1990s, starring as Penny Robinson in the space thriller Lost in Space (1998). Since then, she has been the voice of Eliza Thornberry in the Nickelodeon animated series The Wild Thornberrys, and has voiced Eliza in two films, The Wild Thornberrys Movie (2002) and Rugrats Go Wild (2003). She then had a supporting role in the 2001 parody film Not Another Teen Movie as Amanda Becker. She provided the voice for the titular character's daughter Aleu in Balto 2: Wolf Quest (2002) and she provided the voice of Meg Griffin, uncredited, for the first season of the animated sitcom Family Guy (1999), after which Mila Kunis took over the role when she became too busy with schooling and her other work.

Chabert played the titular role in The Brooke Ellison Story, a biopic produced and directed by Christopher Reeve, based upon a real-life quadriplegic woman who overcame many obstacles to graduate from Harvard University. She starred as Gretchen Wieners in Mean Girls (2004) and the television film Hello Sister, Goodbye Life (2006) on ABC Family. She appeared in a 2006 remake of Black Christmas. She appeared in an episode of Ghost Whisperer opposite former Party of Five co-star Jennifer Love Hewitt. She does the voice of Princess Elise in the video game Sonic the Hedgehog for the PlayStation 3 and Xbox 360. She also voiced Gwen Stacy in the animated series The Spectacular Spider-Man.

Chabert, alongside Lindsay Lohan, Rachel McAdams, and Amanda Seyfried, won the 2005 MTV Movie Award for "Best On-Screen Team" for Mean Girls, where she was chastised by McAdams's character for trying persistently to make her apparent slang coinage "fetch" happen (i.e., become broadly adopted.) She won both the 1997 and 1998 The Hollywood Reporter Annual YoungStar Award for Best Performance by a Young Actress in a Drama TV Series for Party of Five, and had been nominated three other times for work from 1999 to 2000. The YoungStar awards honor the best film, TV, and music performances made exclusively by 6- to 18-year-olds.

From 2013 to 2014, Chabert had a recurring role on the ABC Family sitcom Baby Daddy as Dr. Amy Shaw. After working in several television films during this time, she opened the year 2018 with an original Hallmark movie that premiered as part of the Valentine's Day Countdown.

In 2015, she starred in the successful Christmas TV movie A Christmas Melody alongside Mariah Carey, Brennan Elliott, Kathy Najimy and Fina Strazza. It debuted on the Hallmark Channel on December 19, 2015. The film was viewed by 3.95 million people upon its debut. In 2017, she gave her voice to the animated film All I Want for Christmas Is You, based on the book All I Want for Christmas Is You written by Mariah Carey and Colleen Madden. The film stars the voices of Mariah Carey, Breanna Yde and Henry Winkler.

In 2019, Chabert began starring in the Crossword Mysteries series on the Hallmark Movies & Mysteries channel. After several Hallmark Channel actors left the channel in 2022 to go to the new Great American Family (GAF) network, Chabert voiced her allegiance to Hallmark, and she also signed a new contract allowing her to take on a larger role with the network, which will include producing some of her own movies.

Business ventures 
In September 2022, Chabert launched her own apparel line with home shopping television network HSN called the "Lacey Chabert Collection". In an interview with InStyle, Chabert said: "I've always dreamed of having a clothing line." The line includes jackets, jogger pants, leggings, socks, "Mommy & Me" dresses, cardigans and is priced between $15.00 and $80.00.

In the media 
Appearing in over 30 Hallmark Channel films, Chabert has been referred to as the 'Queen of Hallmark Christmas Movies' by The New York Post and other media sources. Hallmark Channel has called Chabert "one of the best young actresses of her generation" going on to say that her "resume is as extensive as it is versatile". Chabert stated in an E! interview that, "one of the things I love about [working with Hallmark] is you're guaranteed a happy ending [...] I think in the world we're living in today, to be a part of a project that adds a little love and light and levity into the world is something I'm very proud of". More recently, Chabert signed an exclusive multi-film deal with Hallmark Channel's parent Crown Media Family Networks.

Chabert has been featured in blogs and magazines such as Saturday Night, Stuff, People, Entertainment Weekly and Maxim. Chabert appeared on the cover of Maxim at age 31, saying "I got the call from Maxim and then immediately put down the cupcake and ran to the gym."

Personal life 
Chabert married her longtime boyfriend, David Nehdar, on December 22, 2013, in Los Angeles. Chabert gave birth to their daughter Julia in September 2016.

Filmography

Film

Television

Video games

Home media

Awards and nominations

Other media 
 Les Misérables (1992–1993) Broadway Production ... young Cosette
 The Broadway Kids (1994) Audio CD (voice) ... The Broadway Kids Sing Broadway

References

External links 

 

1982 births
Living people
20th-century American actresses
21st-century American actresses
Actresses from Mississippi
Actresses from Los Angeles
American child actresses
American film actresses
American people of English descent
American people of Italian descent
American soap opera actresses
American stage actresses
American television actresses
American video game actresses
American voice actresses
Cajun people
People from Lamar County, Mississippi
Disney people